Harvey Achziger (born August 8, 1931) is an American businessman and former professional football player. Achziger played for the Hamilton Tiger-Cats in Hamilton, Ontario, Canada, with whom he won the Grey Cup in 1957.

Achziger studied agriculture and played college football at Colorado State University, then known as Colorado A&M. Achziger was an All-American in 1952 and was later drafted to the National Football League by the Philadelphia Eagles. He was inducted into the school's Sports Hall of Fame in November 2012.

After a knee injury ended his football career, Achziger moved to Sumter, South Carolina where he works in the family business. He is a father of two and has one grandchild.

Achziger was inducted to the Colorado State University Athletics Hall of Fame in 2012.

Awards
 1951, 1952 - First-team all-Mountain State Athletic Conference
 1952 - All-American
 Colorado State University Athletics Hall of Fame (inducted 2012)
Achziger CSU Athletics Hall of Fame Bio
Source: Colorado State University

References

1931 births
Hamilton Tiger-Cats players
Living people
Colorado State Rams football players
People from Weld County, Colorado
Players of American football from Colorado
American expatriates in Canada